Festuca kingii is a species of grass in the family Poaceae. It is native to California, Colorado, Idaho, Kansas, Montana, Nebraska, Nevada, New Mexico, Oregon, South Dakota, Utah, and Wyoming. It is perennial and mainly grows in temperate biomes. It was first published in 1890.

References

kingii
Flora of California
Flora of Colorado
Flora of Idaho
Flora of Montana
Flora of Nebraska
Flora of Nevada
Flora of New Mexico
Flora of Oregon
Flora of South Dakota
Flora of Wyoming
Flora of Utah
Plants described in 1890